Yanaorco (possibly from in the Quechua spelling Yana Urqu: yana black, urqu mountain, "black mountain") is a mountain in the Andes of Peru which reaches a height of approximately . It is located in the Huancavelica Region, Churcampa Province, on the border of the districts of Coris and Locroja.

References

Mountains of Peru
Mountains of Huancavelica Region